The Unity Bank of Canada was a small Canadian bank that was established in Toronto, Ontario in 1972. Richard Higgins was president and David Matthews was general manager. It amalgamated with the Provincial Bank of Canada on February 14, 1977.

By September 1975, the bank had 23 branches in Quebec, Ontario, British Columbia and Alberta.

In 1977, the Unity Bank experienced problem loans, and large creditors withdrew funds when they became aware of the bank's financial problems. The Bank of Canada advanced funds to provide liquidity support over a three-month period. Historically, very few chartered banks in Canada have experienced liquidity crises.

Journalist Walter Stewart alluded to Unity Bank's troubled history in a 1983 speech to the Empire Club:

See also
List of Canadian banks

References

Defunct banks of Canada
Banks established in 1972
Banks disestablished in 1979
Companies based in Toronto